Serpentines is an album by German jazz saxophonist Ingrid Laubrock, which was recorded in 2016 and released by Intakt Records. It features a septet with an unusual line-up, with Miya Masaoka playing the koto, a traditional Japanese instrument, and individual instrumental parts manipulated electronically by Sam Pluta. Laubrock assembled the band (without guest trumpeter Peter Evans) for the Vision Festival 2015.

Reception

The Down Beat review by Peter Margasak notes, "Laubrock has created a work of remarkable density, both in terms of ideas and physical sound, and it yields greater dividends with each spin."

The All About Jazz review by John Sharpe states, "For this line up Laubrock takes her enigmatic charts for groups such as Anti-house and Ubatuba to another level, as improv jazz meets the classical avant-garde in pieces where mood and texture often trump individual pyrotechnics."

Track listing
All compositions by Ingrid Laubrock.
 "Pothole Analytics Pt. 1" – 4:44
 "Pothole Analytics Pt. 2" – 5:42
 "Chip in Brain" – 12:31
 "Squirrels" – 15:15
 "Serpentines" – 15:20

Personnel
Ingrid Laubrock – tenor sax, soprano sax, glockenspiel
Peter Evans – piccolo trumpet, trumpet
Miya Masaoka – koto
Craig Taborn – piano
Sam Pluta – electronics
Dan Peck – tuba
Tyshawn Sorey – drums

References

 

2016 albums
Ingrid Laubrock albums
Intakt Records albums